Petrina (minor planet designation: 482 Petrina) is a minor planet orbiting the Sun.

Attempts to produce a light curve for this object have yielded differing synodic rotation periods, perhaps in part because the period is close to half an Earth day. Observations suggest that the pole of rotation is near the orbital plane, yielding only small light variations during certain parts of each orbit. Attempts to observe the asteroid photometrically  during an optimal viewing period of the object's orbit gave a rotation period of 11.7922 ± 0.0001 h with an amplitude variation of 0.53 ± 0.05 in magnitude.

References

External links
 
 

Background asteroids
Petrina
Petrina
S-type asteroids (Tholen)
19020303